Dudleya pauciflora is a species of succulent plant in the stonecrop family known by the common name few-flower liveforever. It is characterized by its small crowded rosettes of narrow leaves and its colorful inflorescence with red-yellow flowers. Found growing on rocky outcrops and cliffs in the high elevation mountains of the Sierra de San Pedro Martir and the Sierra de San Borja, it is endemic to the state of Baja California, Mexico.

Description 

Dudleya pauciflora is a rosette-forming succulent plant that forms clumps by branching dichotomously. It is characterized by small, crowded rosettes, a colorful inflorescence with long pedicels, and small, red-marked yellow flowers. When compared to other congeners, the clustered rosettes resemble those of Dudleya abramsii, while the reddish flowers and inflorescence resemble that of Dudleya nubigena. Both Reid Moran and Joseph Nelson Rose suggested the possibility of a relationship between D. pauciflora and D. nubigena.

Morphology 
When plants have densely crowded rosettes, the leaves are erect to ascending; when plants have few rosettes, the leaves are more spreading. The leaves may be green to farinose, shaped triangular-lanceolate, with a narrowly acute, apiculate tip.

The stems are bare of leaves in their lower portions, but have 8 to 30 bracts above. The cyme is composed of 2 to 3 bifurcate or simple branches. The terminal branches are circinate, unfurling like the frond of a fern, and in age become nearly erect. The terminal branches have 2 to 16 flowers, which open at intervals of 2 to 5 days.

The flowers mostly open from July to September. Flower parts usually number in 5. The petals are yellow within, while the keels are flushed with red, giving an orange or reddish appearance to the corolla.

Taxonomy 
Townshend Stith Brandegee, a noted botanist and explorer of the Baja California Peninsula, collected this plant in May of 1893, at a locality some 200 km south of the United States-Mexico border in the Sierra de San Pedro Martir. Brandegee was one of the first botanists to explore this range, which is the highest on the peninsula. As his specimen was collected in May, he was too early to witness the flowers, since this species blooms from July to September. His specimen only contained dry floral stems from the previous season.

Dr. Joseph Nelson Rose, in his revision of the North American Crassulaceae with Nathaniel Lord Britton, named this plant from Brandegee's specimen. Working with only the dried floral stems, the name pauciflora, meaning "few-flowered," was applied. Reid Moran noted that the species does not, in fact, have notably few flowers, but that the epithet was a result of the poor type specimen Rose was working off of.

Distribution and habitat 
Dudleya pauciflora occurs at high elevations in the Sierra San Pedro Mártir and the Sierra de San Borja, in Baja California.

See also 
Montane species of Dudleya:

 Dudleya abramsii
 Dudleya rigida
 Dudleya nubigena

References 

Flora of Baja California
pauciflora
Taxa named by Joseph Nelson Rose
Endemic flora of Mexico